In the United Kingdom, benzole or benzol is a coal-tar product consisting mainly of benzene and toluene. It was originally used as a 'motor spirit', as was petroleum spirits. Benzole was also blended with petrol and sold as a motor fuel under trade names including "National Benzole Mixture" and "Regent Benzole Mixture".

Confusingly, in certain languages, such as German, Hungarian, Ukrainian and Russian the word "benzol" (or benzole) means benzene, and in some of these languages, words pronounced like benzene (e.g. the German word "Benzin") can mean petrol, or gasoline.

See also
 Antiknock agent

References

External links
 The National Benzole Company Insolvent since 8 April 2013

Coal